Charles Porter Ellington (born 1952) FRS was a British zoologist, emeritus Fellow Downing College, Cambridge, and professor emeritus at University of Cambridge.

Education
Ellington was educated at Duke University where he received a Bachelor of Arts degree in 1973. He moved to Cambridge where he was awarded a Master of Arts degree in 1979 and a Doctor of Philosophy degree in 1982.

Research
Ellington did research on animal mechanics.

Awards and honours
Ellington was elected a Fellow of the Royal Society in 1998. His nomination reads

References

British zoologists
Fellows of Downing College, Cambridge
Fellows of the Royal Society
Living people
1952 births